The Nuwara Eliya Post Office is located in the centre of Nuwara Eliya and is one of the oldest post offices in Sri Lanka.

Building

The Tudor-style two-storey red-brick building with a clock spire, was constructed in 1894 by the British.
 
In 2012 the former living quarters of the post master, on the upper floor of the post office, was converted into tourist accommodation. 
 
On the 26 December 1990 Sri Lanka Post issued a Rs. 10 stamp with a photograph of the Post Office, to commemorate World Postal Day.

In June 2017 the United Postal Trade Union went on a three-day strike in order to stop the government's plans to sell the Nuwara Eliya, Kandy and Galle Fort post offices to private developers, in order for the buildings be converted into hotels.

See also 
 Other General Post Offices
 Sri Lanka Post

External links
Sri Lanka Post - Our Heritage

References

Post office buildings in Sri Lanka
Buildings and structures in Nuwara Eliya
British colonial architecture in Sri Lanka
Archaeological protected monuments in Nuwara Eliya District